Victor Austin Eddy (born 14 February 1955, in St Kitts) was a West Indies cricketer in the 1970s and 1980s. He played for the Combined Islands and Leeward Islands in his first-class career. His batting style was right hand and bowling style right-arm offbreak.

References

External links 

1955 births
Living people
Kittitian cricketers
Combined Islands cricketers
Leeward Islands cricketers